Albania competed at the 2016 European Athletics Championships in Amsterdam, Netherlands, between 6 and 10 July 2016.

Medals

Results

Men
Track & road events

Women
Track & road events

References

2016
Nations at the 2016 European Athletics Championships
2016 in Albanian sport